Commessaggio is a comune (municipality) in the Province of Mantua in the Italian region Lombardy, located about  southeast of Milan and about  southwest of Mantua.

The municipality of Commessaggio contains the frazione (subdivision) Bocca Chiavica.

Commessaggio borders the following municipalities: Gazzuolo, Sabbioneta, Spineda, Viadana.

Demographic evolution

References

Cities and towns in Lombardy